Quentin Durward Corley, Sr. (January 21, 1884 - April 22, 1980) was a Texas circuit judge.

Biography
He was born in Mexia, Texas on January 21, 1884, to Daniel Jacob Corley (1852–1948) and Mary Louise California (1851–1946). His parents were from Alabama, and moved to Texas in 1874. Quentin  moved to Dallas, Texas in 1895. In 1901 he graduated from the Oak Cliff high school. On September 18, 1905, in Utica, New York he was in a railroad accident and lost both hands and one arm and shoulder. Within two years he invented and patented an artificial limb.

He went on to study law in the offices of Muse & Allen in Dallas, and in 1907 passed the Dallas County, Texas bar. In 1908 he was elected to the office of justice of the peace, and his service in that capacity was of such a character that in the campaign of 1912 he was elected a county judge. He died on April 22, 1980, in Dallas, Texas.

Patents
Improvements in and relating to artificial arms (1920)

Legacy
Quentin D. Corley Academy

References

1884 births
1980 deaths
People from Mexia, Texas
Lawyers from Dallas
Texas state court judges
American amputees
20th-century American judges
20th-century American inventors
20th-century American lawyers